Sri Purandaradasa Aradhana is the annual aradhana (a Sanskrit term meaning act of glorifying God or a person) of Kannada saint composer Purandara Dasa, who is considered as "The Pitamaha" (lit, "father" or the "grandfather") of Carnatic Music. The festival is observed in the states of Andhra Pradesh and Karnataka, primarily in Hampi, the place where Purandara Dasa lived and attained Samadhi The aradhana is observed on Pushya Bahula Amavasya day, when the saint attained samadhi.

History
The aradhana (Ceremony of Adoration) is held every year on the anniversary of the demise of the saint. This is on the Pushya Bahula Amavasya of the Indian Lunar calendar (a new moon day, generally in February–March).The Aradhana is celebrated across various parts of South India including Pandarapur, Tirumala, Hampi and Mantralayam. In Hampi it's organised by Purandara Dasara Aradhana Samithi Trust with annual programmes
In Tirumala, it is organised by the Tirumala Tirupati Devasthanams (TTD) Dasa Sahitya Project annually around January – February.

In the early 1970s, Jayachamaraja Wadiyar expressed regret that Purandaradasa was not given the status in Karnataka that Tyagaraja enjoyed in Tamil Nadu. Inspired by this Kannada journalist N.A. Murthy started Purandara Dasara Aradhana at Hampi and organised the annual programme from 1974 to 1976. After the death of Murthy his son Raja Rao started organising the annual programme at Purandara Vittala Devalaya, Mulbagal.

See also
List of Indian classical music festivals

References

Music festivals in India
Carnatic classical music festivals
Hindu music festivals